The Hundred Years' War on Palestine is a 2020 book by Rashid Khalidi, in which the author describes the Zionist claim to Palestine in the century spanning 1917–2017 as late settler colonialism and an instrument of British and then later American imperialism, doing so by focusing on a series of six major episodes the author characterizes as "declarations of war" on the Palestinian people. In the book, Khalidi—historian and Edward Said Professor of Modern Arab Studies at Columbia University—argues that the struggle in Palestine should be understood, not as one between two equal national movements fighting over the same land, but rather as "a colonial war waged against the indigenous population, by a variety of parties, to force them to relinquish their homeland to another people against their will."

In addition to the more traditional sources and methods employed by a historian, the author in this book draws on family archives, stories passed down through his family from generation to generation, and his own experiences, as an activist in various circles and as someone who has been involved in negotiations among Palestinian groups and with Israelis.

Synopsis

Introduction 
The book begins with an examination of correspondence from 1889 between Yusuf Diya ad-Din Pasha al-Khalidi, mayor of Jerusalem and relative of the author, and Theodor Herzl, father of modern political Zionism. In his response, Herzl ignores the main concerns raised by the Pasha and in reference to the indigenous, non-Jewish population of Palestine, Herzl quips: "But who would think of sending them away?" The author sees this early exchange as revelatory that Zionism was an essentially colonial project from its inception, and that the Palestinians were never taken seriously and only rarely were their opinions consulted in matters that would determine their future.

"The First Declaration of War, 1917–1939" 
The first chapter of the book deals with the Balfour Declaration November 1917, announcing the British Empire's support for the "establishment in Palestine of a national home for the Jewish people," and the Mandate for Palestine granted by the League of Nations to Britain in 1922, which established Mandatory Palestine in the aftermath of the dissolution of the Ottoman Empire—neither document made reference to "Arabs" or "Palestinians" or to their national rights. The Jewish Agency for Palestine, acting an almost governmental administration over the following 26 years, was an officially recognized representative of the Jewish minority in Palestine, and there was no comparable institution for the Arab majority.

"The Second Declaration of War, 1947–1948" 
The second chapter has the United States replacing Britain in 1947 as the imperial power, with its moves to gather international support to ensure the passage of UN partition resolution, which approved the establishment of a Jewish state on 56% of Arab majority land, thereby violating the Palestinians' right to "national self-determination" as guaranteed in the UN Charter. It was followed by civil violence, the Establishment of the State of Israel, the First Arab-Israeli War, and the Nakba, in which about 700,000 Palestinians fled or were expelled to neighboring Arab states. Land that had been owned and abandoned by fleeing and ousted Palestinians was expropriated by the Israeli government to be used solely for the benefit of the Jewish people, being added to extant Jewish settlements or coming under the control of the Israel Lands Authority and Jewish National Fund.

"The Third Declaration of War, 1967" 
The third chapter highlights the colonial role of the US in the Lyndon B. Johnson administration's approbation of Israel's preemptive strikes on Egypt, Jordan, and Syria in the 1967 War, as well as in its support for UNSC Resolution 242, which legitimated the conquest of East Jerusalem, West Bank, Gaza Strip, Sinai Peninsula, and Golan Heights and made no mention of Palestine or the Palestinians or their rights.

"The Fourth Declaration of War, 1982" 
The fourth chapter also points to US compliance in Israeli aggression, with its support for the 1982 Israeli invasion of Lebanon under Menachem Begin to obliterate the Palestine Liberation Organization and Palestinian nationalism. The author regards it as a joint Israeli-American operation, as the US supplied Israel with weapons and supported the expulsion of the PLO's leadership and combatants from Beirut to Tunis.

This chapter is the most personal, as the author lived in Beirut for 15 years with his family. It also presents damning evidence, based on documents leaked from the Israel State Archives in 2012 as well as secret appendices from the Kahan Commission that weren't published in the original 1983 report, of the Israeli government's conscious decision to send Christian militias into the Sabra and Shatila refugee camps with the clear intention of instigating the Sabra and Shatila massacre.

"The Fifth Declaration of War, 1987–1995" 
The fifth chapter addresses the brutal Israeli backlash against the First Intifada, the relentless expansion of Israeli settlements in the occupied West Bank and Gaza, and the Oslo Accords—which did not resolve resolve any fundamental Palestinian demands, such as national sovereignty, an end to occupation and colonization, the right of return for refugees, an agreement on Jerusalem, delineated borders, and land and water rights, and which were arranged based on close political, diplomatic, and military ties between Israel and the US, and were therefore tantamount to "another internationally sanctioned American-Israeli declaration of war on the Palestinians in furtherance of the Zionist movement's century-old project."

"The sixth Declaration of War, 2000–2014" 
The sixth chapter covers four chapters of Israeli violence against Palestinians in the West Bank and Gaza: backlash against the Second Intifada and the Israeli military's three attacks on Gaza in 2008, 2012, and 2014. The author notes that the massive death toll and physical destruction of buildings and infrastructure were caused by lethal weapons supplied to Israel by the US, including armed drones, Apache helicopters, F-15 and F-16 war planes, and 155mm howitzer artillery guns.

Reception 
Lisa Anderson described the book in Foreign Affairs as presenting "the most cogent, comprehensive, and compelling account yet of this struggle from the Palestinian vantage point."

Translations 
It was translated into Arabic by  under the title "Ḥarb al-miʼah ʻām ʻalaʹ Filisṭīn : qiṣat al-istiʻmār al-istīṭānī wa-al muqawimah 1917–2017".

References 

Books about Palestine (region)
2020 non-fiction books
Metropolitan Books books